Carolyn Parrish (born Karolina Janoszewska; October 3, 1946) is a politician in Ontario, Canada. She was a member of the House of Commons from 1993 to 2006 representing ridings in Mississauga, Ontario; initially as a Liberal Party MP, and then as an independent MP from 2004 to 2006 following her removal from the party. She became a city councillor for Mississauga City Council in 2006, and remained there until 2010, when she was defeated by Ron Starr.  After a brief retirement from politics, Parrish contested and won the position of Councillor for Ward 5 in the 2014 municipal election.

Background 
Parrish was born as Karolina Janoszewska and is of Polish heritage. Her sister is romance novelist Marsha Canham. Parrish studied at the University of Toronto, St. Michael's College, graduating in 1969, and became a high school teacher. She served as a Trustee in the Region of Peel from 1985 to 1990, and was chairperson from 1988 to 1990. She was first elected to the House of Commons as a Liberal in the 1993 election and was re-elected in the three subsequent general elections of 1997, 2000 and 2004. She ended her federal career representing the Mississauga, Ontario riding of Mississauga—Erindale as an independent Member of Parliament.

Federal politics

Criticism of the United States administration 

Never promoted from the parliamentary backbench, Parrish was largely unknown nationally until the eve of the U.S.-led Invasion of Iraq in 2003. On her way out of a meeting on February 26, 2003, in a media scrum Parrish was overheard on a boom mike saying, "Damn Americans, I hate those bastards!" She later told the media that her comments were directed towards George W. Bush and his administration and not the American people as a whole. Members of the opposition Canadian Alliance party called for her to be punished by then Liberal leader and Prime Minister Jean Chrétien, but no disciplinary action occurred.

After the widespread media attention on her "America-bashing" incident, she remained popular in her home riding. After electoral redistribution leading up to the 2004 election, she faced fellow Liberal MP Steve Mahoney in a nomination battle and narrowly won. She was re-elected with 54% of the vote in the general election, against 32% for her Conservative opponent.

In August 2004, Parrish again created controversy by referring to those supporting the North American missile defence proposal as "a coalition of the idiots," mocking the phrase "coalition of the willing" used by Bush describing the American-led alliance in the invasion of Iraq. Paul Martin, who had succeeded Chrétien as Prime Minister, asked her to use more tact and discretion when sharing her opinions about such subjects but stopped short of asking her to apologize. She responded by saying, "I was elected by thousands of people in my riding. They have known me for years. I think they like my style."

Following the November U.S. election, she expressed shock at the re-election of George W. Bush. She said that "America is completely out of touch with the rest of the free world" and blamed this on collective "profound psychological damage" due to the September 11, 2001 attacks. She was also quoted as saying, "I wouldn't guess what's next on his agenda, but it's probably not peace and love." When Conservative Party members called on her to apologize for these remarks she said that such comments "are in the best traditions of free speech and independence of thought." These comments came just hours after Paul Martin warned his MPs in a private caucus meeting not to make incendiary comments in the wake of the U.S. election.  Parrish explained that she wasn't at the meeting, but that even if she had been, it wouldn't have stopped her from speaking her mind.

In October 2004, at the annual Parliamentary Press Gallery dinner in Ottawa, Martin joked about meeting with Bush and discussing the possibility of a manned mission to Mars. "I thought to myself, wouldn't it be great if we could get a Canadian on board? If a Canadian could be sent tens of millions of miles into the dark void of space. And as we all as a nation watch on television and together say aloud, `Bon voyage, Carolyn Parrish!'"

This Hour Has 22 Minutes incident and departure from caucus 

On November 17, 2004, clips of a skit for the CBC Television comedy series This Hour Has 22 Minutes were released, in which she stomped on a Bush doll and performed voodoo on its head, where she said "it would do the least damage." The full version was to air on November 19. The sketch caused outrage from Conservative members and prompted Martin to ask for a meeting with her.

On November 18, a Canadian Press story quoted her as saying Martin, and those around him, could "go to hell" if they wanted her to stop making similar comments. She went on to say that she had no loyalty towards the Liberal Party and that if it were defeated in the next election, she "would not shed a tear," as she had felt betrayed by Martin's lack of help for her during her nomination and election campaigns. In response to these comments, Martin, with the support of National Liberal Caucus chair Andy Savoy, expelled her from caucus, saying, "Even though I respect her right to express her viewpoint, I cannot, as leader of our party and of our caucus, tolerate her behaviour."

On November 19, Parrish spoke to the press about her expulsion from caucus. She said that had she been in Martin's place, she would have done the same. She went on to say, however, that the party under Martin had fallen into disarray and that Martin and his inner circle ran the party using guerrilla warfare tactics. She said she would still vote with the Liberals on the vast majority of legislation, but would now be free to express her views without fear of reprisal.

Though excluded from caucus, Parrish initially still sat as a Liberal in the House of Commons but became an independent on November 21 so that the speaker would give her time in member's statements and question period without the notice of the Liberal whip.

On November 30, 2004, Parrish appeared on CNN in an interview with Wolf Blitzer and Tucker Carlson, defending her position against Bush and her recent actions that led to ousting from the Liberal party. She also defended the overall Canadian stance regarding the Iraq War and the National Missile Defence program. Several days later Martin appeared on Late Edition, with Blitzer hosting.  Blitzer talked about several MPs attacking Bush and Martin replied that only Parrish had made attacks and that they had been condemned throughout Parliament.

Independent MP and retirement from federal politics 

Parrish announced in December 2004 that she would oppose the Martin government's proposed legislation to legally establish same-sex marriage in Canada. A surprise to the Prime Minister, Parrish claimed that, although she personally supports same-sex marriage, her constituents were generally opposed to it.

On May 19, 2005, Paul Martin's Liberal government faced two votes of confidence on its 2005-06 budget legislation. In the days leading up to the vote, Parrish said that she would support the government despite her difficulties with Martin's administration. Her support was critical to the government's survival, given the even division in the house. On the morning of the vote, Parrish informed a media representative that she was suffering from severe pain due to a medical ailment. She attended the vote, which the government won by one vote.

In July 2005, Parrish castigated Chief of Defence Staff General Rick Hillier as being "dangerous" and a "testosterone-filled general" after he made comments stating that a soldier's purpose was "to be able to kill people" such as terrorists whom he described as "murderers and scumbags."

Although Parrish indicated that she was considering returning to the Liberal Caucus and remains to date a card-carrying member of the Liberal Party, an aide to the Prime Minister stated on July 29, 2005 that "he's not even entertaining the thought of welcoming Carolyn Parrish back to caucus." Parrish was the only one of four Independent MPs in the House to vote with the government against the successful November 28, 2005 motion of non-confidence that brought down the Liberal government.

On October 13, 2005, Parrish's spokeswoman announced that the MP had sent a letter to her constituents stating that she would not stand for re-election. She publicly supported the Liberal candidate, Omar Alghabra, ahead of the 2006 election.

Mississauga City Council

In the 2006 municipal election, Parrish was elected to Ward 6 by 1,400 votes. In 2009, she raised concerns on council regarding the possible conflict of interest of McCallion's son's company in a failed land deal involving the council, and McCallion herself in promoting it. In particular, she claimed that he personally stood to gain $10 million. An inquiry led by Douglas Cunningham was ultimately called to investigate the allegations. However, at the 2010 municipal election, Parrish lost to McCallion ally Ron Starr by 1,889 votes. She subsequently announced her retirement from political life, although has left the way open for re-entering at some point. She contested a by-election in neighbouring Ward 5 on September 19, 2011, losing to Bonnie Crombie by 241 votes. Shortly after the election, Cunningham's report was released, including a finding that McCallion had a "conflict of interest, both real and apparent" in the land deal. Parrish told media that she felt the election result would have been different had this been known.

Parrish is currently the councillor for Ward 5 in Mississauga City Council, after winning the seat in the 2014 municipal election. She has stated that she believes non-citizen permanent residents should have the right to sit on municipal committees, though not on the city council itself.

References

External links

1946 births
Living people
Canadian people of Polish descent
Women municipal councillors in Canada
Women members of the House of Commons of Canada
Independent MPs in the Canadian House of Commons
Members of the House of Commons of Canada from Ontario
Mississauga city councillors
Politicians from Toronto
University of Toronto alumni
Women in Ontario politics
21st-century Canadian politicians
21st-century Canadian women politicians
Liberal Party of Canada MPs
Canadian schoolteachers
20th-century Canadian politicians
20th-century Canadian women politicians
Politicians affected by a party expulsion process